The Flee-Rekkers – also known as  The Fabulous Flee-Rakkers – were a British instrumental rock and roll band in the late 1950s and early 1960s.  The group name varied on early singles; they were billed as "The Fabulous Flee-Rakkers" or "The Fabulous Flea-Rakkers" in early 1960, before settling on "The Flee-Rekkers" for all later releases.  They were fronted by tenor saxophonist Peter Fleerakkers (or Fleerackers), and their records were produced by Joe Meek.  Their biggest hit was "Green Jeans" in 1960.

History
The group was influenced by saxophone-led bands like Johnny and the Hurricanes.  They started under the names The Ramblers and The Statesiders (from February 1959), before taking a more permanent name derived from that of their leader Peter Fleerackers (tenor sax) (born Peter Luke Fleerackers,  Brentford, 1934, died 21 December 2016), whose father was Dutch.  Other members of the group were Dave 'Tex' Cameron (lead guitar) (born 21 October 1939, Ealing, West London, died July 2022), Alan Monger (rhythm guitar, baritone sax) (born 12 October 1939, Hackney, East London), Elmy Durrant (tenor sax) (born 24 March 1939, Edgware, Middlesex), Derek Skinner (bass) (born 5 March 1942, London), and Mickey Waller (drums).

They were spotted playing at a The Hive Jive, The Putney Ballroom in Putney, South West London in late 1959, and successfully auditioned for record producer Joe Meek.  He produced their first single, "Green Jeans", a rocked-up version of the traditional "Greensleeves" released on Meek's own label, Triumph Records, in early 1960.  The record reached No. 23 on the UK Singles Chart, but demand outstripped Meek's capacity to supply copies. After the Triumph label collapsed, the record was reissued on the Top Rank label, which itself was then taken over by EMI. The group also featured on a single, "Hot Chick-A-Roo", by singer Ricky Wayne (born Learie Carasco), who became a prominent bodybuilder and, later, a noted writer and broadcaster in Saint Lucia.

The Flee-Rekkers released several more singles and an EP with less success, at first on the Pye label, and then on Piccadilly. According to the liner notes of their EP, they "were the first 'rock' group to be signed for a long term contract with Mecca after making appearances at their ballrooms up and down the country, and in the London area." They toured Britain extensively in the early 1960s, with a reputedly "wild" live act. Their final single in 1963, "Fireball", a version of the theme music to the animated TV series Fireball XL5, arranged by Tony Hatch, is regarded as one of their best.

The group broke up in August 1963.  Fleerakkers played in various unsuccessful bands before leaving the music business in the late 1960s.  Cameron, Monger and Durrant formed a new group, The Giants, who mainly performed in Germany. They played at The Top Ten Club, Hamburg, West Germany from October 1963 with new lead singer Tony Vincent (born 12 May 1941, London). They had already been joined by bassist Harry Kershaw (born 5 October 1944, Blackpool, Lancashire) and drummer Kenny Slade (born 27 May 1939, Canterbury, Kent). 

Skinner became a member of the Spotnicks. Waller became a leading session drummer, playing with such musicians as Cyril Davies, Long John Baldry, Rod Stewart, Brian Auger, John Mayall and Jeff Beck; he died in 2008.  Peter Fleerackers died in 2016, and Dave "Tex" Cameron in 2022.

A CD containing most of the group's recordings was issued by C-Five Records in 1991, and later in expanded versions by See For Miles Records and Castle Records.

Discography

Singles

Extended play

Albums

Notes

References

Beat groups
British instrumental musical groups
British rock and roll music groups
English pop music groups
Musical groups established in 1959
Musical groups disestablished in 1963
1959 establishments in England